The Detroit Film Critics Society Award for Best Director is an annual award given by the Detroit Film Critics Society to honor the best director of that year.

Winners 

 † indicates the winner of the Academy Award for Best Director.

2000s

2010s

2020s

See also
Academy Award for Best Director

References

Detroit Film Critics Society Awards
Awards for best director
Lists of films by award